Darrell Henegan (born June 27, 1961) is an American-born Canadian former taekwondo practitioner and kickboxer.

Taekwondo

Henegan's taekwondo career spanned the years 1979-2001.  During that time he won numerous awards in four different decades.  They included Canadian, Pan American, and North American Championships, as well as winning the 1981 World Taekwondo Games in Santa Clara, California.  At that event he became the first North American to beat the Koreans in a World Championship Gold Medal match.

Kickboxing

Darrell competed as a professional kickboxer from 1984-1996.  He finished with a record of 25 wins and 2 losses, with 20 wins by KO.  He held numerous titles and was a two-time world champion.  In 1988 he won the FFKA Heavyweight Title by decisioning Jerry Rhome and in 1993 he won the ISKA Cruiserweight Championship with a win over Przemyslaw Saletta.  One of Henegan's losses was in a 1990 unification bout with KICK/ISKA Heavyweight Champion Dennis Alexio.  He also had one bout as a professional boxer, a four-round unanimous decision over Daniel DesRoches in 1986.

Kickboxing record

|-
|-  bgcolor="#CCFFCC"
| 1993-00-00 || Win ||align=left| Przemysław Saleta || || || || || || 
|-
! style=background:white colspan=9 |
|-
|-  bgcolor="#CCFFCC"
| 1991-00-00 || Win ||align=left| Neil Singleton || || || || || || 
|-
! style=background:white colspan=9 |
|-
|-  bgcolor="#FFBBBB"
| 1990-08-06 || Loss ||align=left| Dennis Alexio || Harrah's Lake Tahoe || Stateline, Nevada, USA || TKO (punches) || 5 || 1:54 || 17-2
|-
! style=background:white colspan=9 |
|-
|-  bgcolor="#CCFFCC"
| 1989-00-00 || Win ||align=left| Larry Cureton || || || || || || 
|-
! style=background:white colspan=9 |
|-
|-
| colspan=9 | Legend:

External links
 Tae Kwon Do Greats of Canada
 
 vs. Dennis Alexio Part 1
 vs. Dennis Alexio Part 2
 vs. Dennis Alexio Part 3
 

1961 births
Living people
Canadian male kickboxers
Cruiserweight kickboxers
Heavyweight kickboxers
Canadian male taekwondo practitioners
Canadian male boxers
Pan American Games medalists in taekwondo
Pan American Games bronze medalists for Canada
Canadian people of African-American descent
American emigrants to Canada
Black Canadian boxers
Sportspeople from Queens, New York
Sportspeople from Montreal
Anglophone Quebec people
Taekwondo practitioners at the 1999 Pan American Games
Medalists at the 1999 Pan American Games